Aame is a 1994 Telugu-language drama film by E. V. V. Satyanarayana. The film stars Ooha, Naresh and Srikanth. The film was remade in Kannada as Thaliya Sowbhagya (1995) starring Ramkumar and Shruthi and in Tamil as Thaali Pudhusu (1997) starring Ramki and Khushboo. The film won two Nandi Awards and one Filmfare Award. Aame was the first movie to feature Srikanth and Ooha together.

Cast
 Srikanth as Anjaneyulu
 Ooha as Ooha	
 Naresh as Vikram
 Chandra Mohan as Subrahmanyam
 Tanikella Bharani as Pattabhi
 Kota Srinivasa Rao as Srinivasa Rao
 Sangeeta as Ooha's mother
 Sudha as Anjaneyulu's mother
 Varalakshmi as Varalakshmi
 Brahmanandam as Priest
 AVS

Soundtrack 

Music composed by Vidyasagar. Music released on Aditya Music Company.

Awards
Nandi Awards - 1994
Best Actress - Ooha
Special Jury Award - I. Mohan Rao

Filmfare Awards South
Filmfare Award for Best Film - Telugu - Mullapudi Brahmanandam

References

External links

.

1994 films
Indian drama films
1990s Telugu-language films
Films about women in India
Films scored by Vidyasagar
Films directed by E. V. V. Satyanarayana
Telugu films remade in other languages